The following is an incomplete list of the compositions of Alban Berg:

 Jugendlieder (1), composed 1901–4, voice and piano, published 1985
 "Herbstgefühl" (Siegfried Fleischer)
 "Spielleute" (Henrik Ibsen)
 "Wo der Goldregen steht" (F. Lorenz)
 "Lied der Schiffermädels" (Otto Julius Bierbaum)
 "Sehnsucht" I (Paul Hohenberg)
 "Abschied" (Elimar von Monsterberg-Muenckenau)
 "Grenzen der Menschheit" (Johann Wolfgang von Goethe)
 "Vielgeliebte schöne Frau" (Heinrich Heine)
 "Sehnsucht" II (Paul Hohenberg)
 "Sternefall" (Karl Wilhelm)
 "Sehnsucht" III (Paul Hohenberg)
 "Ich liebe dich!" (Christian Dietrich Grabbe)
 "Ferne Lieder" (Friedrich Rückert)
 "Ich will die Fluren meiden" (Friedrich Rückert)
 "Geliebte Schöne" (Heinrich Heine)
 "Schattenleben" (Martin Greif)
 "Am Abend" (Emanuel Geibel)
 "Vorüber!" (Franz Wisbacher)
 "Schummerlose Nächte" (Martin Greif)
 "Es wandelt, was wir schauen (Joseph von Eichendorff)
 "Liebe (Rainer Maria Rilke)
 "Im Morgengrauen (Karl Stieler)
 "Grabschrift (Ludwig Jakobowski)
 Jugendlieder (2), composed 1904–8, voice and piano, published 1985
"Traum" (Frida Semler)
"Augenblicke" (Robert Hamerling)
"Die Näherin" (Rainer Maria Rilke)
"Erster Verlust" (Johann Wolfgang von Goethe)
"Süss sind mir die Schollen des Tales" (Karl Ernst Knodt)
"Er klagt das der Frühling so kortz blüht" (Arno Holz)
"Tiefe Sehnsucht" (Detlev von Liliencron)
"Über den Bergen" (Karl Busse)
"Am Strande" (Georg Scherer)
"Winter" (Johannes Schlaf)
"Fraue, du Süsse" (Ludwig Finckh)
"Verlassen" (Bohemian folksong)
"Regen" (Johannes Schlaf)
"Traurigkeit" (Peter Altenberg)
"Hoffnung" (Peter Altenberg)
"Flötenspielerin" (Peter Altenberg)
"Spaziergang" (Alfred Mombert)
"Eure Weisheit" (Johann Georg Fischer)
"So regnet es sich langsam ein" (Cäsar Flaischlein)
"Mignon" (Johann Wolfgang von Goethe)
"Die Sorglichen" (Gustav Falke)
"Das stille Königreich" (Karl Busse)
"An Leukon" (Johann Wilhelm Ludwig Gleim)
 Seven Early Songs, voice and piano, composed 1905–8, revised and orchestrated 1928
 "Nacht" (Carl Hauptmann)
 "Schilflied" (Nikolaus Lenau)
 "Die Nachtigall" (Theodor Storm)
 "Traumgekrönt" (Rainer Maria Rilke)
 "Im Zimmer" (Johannes Schlaf)
 "Liebesode" (Otto Erich Hartleben)
 "Sommertage" (Paul Hohenberg)
 Schliesse mir die Augen beide (Theodor Storm), voice and piano, composed 1907, published in 1930 & 1955
 An Leukon (Johann Wilhelm Ludwig Gleim), voice and piano, composed 1908; published in 1937 & 1963 (Reich) & 1985 (UE) (2 versions exist: in G minor [1907]; in E minor [1908])
 Frühe Klaviermusik, published 1989
 Zwölf Variationen über ein eigenes Thema in C, piano, composed Nov. 8, 1908; published in 1957 & 1985
 Symphony and Passacaglia, fragment, composed 1913
 Piano Sonata, Op. 1, composed 1907–8, published April 24, 1911
 Vier Lieder, Op. 2, voice and piano, composed 1909–10, published 1910
 "Schlafen, schlafen" (Friedrich Hebbel)
 "Schlafend trägt man mich" (Alfred Mombert)
 "Nun ich der Riesen Stärksten" (Alfred Mombert)
 "Warm die Lüfte" (Alfred Mombert)
 String Quartet, Op. 3, composed 1910, published 1920
 Fünf Orchesterlieder nach Ansichtkartentexten von Peter Altenberg, Op. 4, soprano and orchestra, 1912 (Altenberg Lieder)
 "Seele, wie bist du schöner"
 "Sahst du nach dem Gewitterregen"
 "Über die Grenzen des All"
 "Nichts ist gekommen"
 "Hier ist Friede"
 Vier Stücke, Op. 5, clarinet and piano, composed 1913, published 1920

 Three Pieces for Orchestra (Drei Orchesterstücke), Op. 6, composed 1914–15

 Wozzeck, Op. 7, composed 1914–22
 Drei Bruchstücke aus ‘Wozzeck’, soprano and orchestra
 Kammerkonzert, piano, violin, and 13 winds, composed 1923–5
 Adagio, violin, clarinet and piano, arranged 1926 (arrangement of Kammerkonzert mvmt. 2)
 Schliesse mir die Augen beide (Theodor Storm), voice and piano, composed 1925
 Lyric Suite, string quartet, composed 1925–6
 Drei Sätze aus der Lyrischen Suite, arranged for string orchestra, 1928
 "Der Wein" (Charles Baudelaire), concert aria, soprano and orchestra, composed 1929
 Four-part Canon Alban Berg an das Frankfurter Opernhaus, composed 1930
 Lulu, composed 1929–35, orchestration of Act 3 completed by Friedrich Cerha
 Symphonische Stücke aus der Oper ‘Lulu’ (Lulu-Suite), soprano and orchestra, premièred under Kleiber in 1934
 Violin Concerto, composed 1935
 Vocal scores
 Franz Schreker: Der ferne Klang (1911)
 Arnold Schoenberg: Gurre-Lieder (1912)
 Arnold Schoenberg: Litanei and Entrückung from String Quartet no.2, 1912
 Arrangement for string quartet, piano, and harmonium
 Johann Strauss II: Wein, Weib und Gesang, 1921

See also
List of compositions by Anton Webern

References

 
Berg, Alban, Compositions by

nl:Oeuvre van Alban Berg